Ira Marvin Levin (August 27, 1929 – November 12, 2007) was an American novelist, playwright, and songwriter. His works include the novels A Kiss Before Dying (1953), Rosemary's Baby (1967), The Stepford Wives (1972), This Perfect Day (1970), and The Boys from Brazil (1976), as well as the play Deathtrap (1978). Many of his novels and plays have been adapted into films. He received the Prometheus Hall of Fame Award and Edgar Awards (1992–2003).

Early life
Levin was born on August 27, 1929, in the New York City, New York borough of Manhattan. He grew up in both Manhattan and the Bronx. His father, Charles, was a toy importer. Levin was educated at the private Horace Mann School in New York. During his youth, he was described as "a nice Jewish boy from New York". He attended Drake University in Des Moines, Iowa from 1946 to 1948 and then New York University, where he majored in philosophy and English. He graduated in 1950. He served in the Army Signal Corps from 1953 to 1955.

Professional life

Scriptwriting
After college, Levin wrote training films and scripts for radio and television. The first of these was "Leda's Portrait", for Lights Out in 1951.

Levin's first produced play was No Time for Sergeants (adapted from the 1954 Mac Hyman novel), a comedy about a hillbilly drafted into the United States Air Force. It opened on Broadway in 1955 and starred Andy Griffith, whose career it jumpstarted. The play was adapted as a movie of the same name, released in 1958, with Griffith reprising his role and co-starring Nick Adams. Later the concept was developed as a 1964 television comedy series starring Sammy Jackson. No Time for Sergeants is generally considered the precursor to Gomer Pyle, U.S.M.C..

Levin's best-known play is Deathtrap (1978), which holds the record as the longest-running comedy thriller on Broadway. Levin won his second Edgar Award with this play. In 1982, it was adapted into a film of the same name, starring Christopher Reeve and Michael Caine.

Novels
Levin's first novel, A Kiss Before Dying (1953), was well received, and he won the 1954 Edgar Award for Best First Novel. A Kiss Before Dying was adapted twice as a movie of the same name, first in 1956 and again in 1991.

Levin's best-known novel is Rosemary's Baby, a horror story of modern-day Satanism and other occultisms, set in Manhattan's Upper West Side. In 1968, it was adapted as a film written and directed by Roman Polanski. It starred  Mia Farrow and John Cassavetes. Ruth Gordon won an Oscar for Best Actress in a Supporting Role for her performance. Roman Polanski was nominated for Best Writing, Screenplay Based on Material from Another Medium.

Levin said in 2002, 
"I feel guilty that 'Rosemary's Baby' led to The Exorcist, The Omen. A whole generation has been exposed, has more belief in Satan. I don't believe in Satan. And I feel that the strong fundamentalism we have would not be as strong if there hadn't been so many of these books [...] Of course, I didn't send back any of the royalty checks."

Other Levin novels that were adapted as films included The Stepford Wives in 1975, again in 2004. The Boys from Brazil was adapted as a film released in 1978.

In the 1990s, Levin wrote two more bestselling novels: Sliver (1991), which was adapted as a film in 1993 by Phillip Noyce. It starred Sharon Stone, William Baldwin and Tom Berenger. His Son of Rosemary (1997) was proposed as a sequel to Rosemary’s Baby. It was never developed into a film.

Stephen King has described Ira Levin as the "Swiss watchmaker" of suspense novels: "Every novel he has ever written has been a marvel of plotting. He is the Swiss watchmaker of the suspense novel; he makes what the rest of us do look like those five-dollar watches you can buy in the discount drug stores."

Personal life
Levin was a Jewish atheist.

Levin was married twice, first to Gabrielle Aronsohn (from 1960 to 1968), with whom he had three sons, Adam, Jared, and Nicholas, and later to Phyllis Sugarman (died 2006). He had four grandchildren.

Death
Levin died of a heart attack at his home in Manhattan on November 12, 2007.

Works

Novels
A Kiss Before Dying (1953)
Rosemary's Baby (1967)
This Perfect Day (1970) – winner, 1992 Prometheus Hall of Fame Award
The Stepford Wives (1972)
The Boys from Brazil (1976)
Sliver (1991)
Son of Rosemary (1997)

Plays
No Time for Sergeants (1956)
Interlock (1958)
Critic's Choice (1960)
General Seeger (1962)
Dr. Cook's Garden (1968)
Veronica's Room (1974)
Deathtrap (1978) – Tony nomination for Best Play
Break a Leg: A Comedy in Two Acts (1979)
Cantorial (1982)
 Footsteps (2003)

Musicals
Drat! The Cat! (1965) – lyricist and bookwriter

Film adaptations
A Kiss Before Dying (1956)
No Time for Sergeants (1958)
Critic's Choice (1963)
Rosemary's Baby (1968)
The Stepford Wives (1975)
The Boys from Brazil (1978)
Deathtrap (1982)
A Kiss Before Dying (1991)
Sliver (1993)
Footsteps (2003)
The Stepford Wives (2004)
Rosemary's Baby (2014)

References

Further reading
John Grant, "Levin, Ira (Marvin)", in David Pringle, ed., St. James Guide to Horror, Ghost and Gothic Writers. London: St. James Press, 1998,

External links

1929 births
2007 deaths
20th-century American dramatists and playwrights
20th-century American Jews
20th-century American male writers
20th-century American novelists
21st-century American Jews
American horror writers
American male dramatists and playwrights
American male novelists
American mystery writers
American people of Russian-Jewish descent
Edgar Award winners
Horace Mann School alumni
Jewish American novelists
New York University alumni
People from the Bronx
People from Wilton, Connecticut
Novelists from Connecticut
Novelists from New York (state)
Writers from Manhattan